Martín (Hache) is a 1997 Spanish and Argentine film directed by Adolfo Aristarain and starring Federico Luppi, Juan Diego Botto, Cecilia Roth and Eusebio Poncela.

It was the fifth most watched domestic film in Argentina, with 380,000 viewers. It was nominated for four Goya Awards in 1998, and Cecilia Roth won one for lead actress. It also 4 Silver Condors (Argentina film awards); for Best Director (Adolfo Aristarain), Best Actor (Federico Luppi), Best Actress (Cecilia Roth) and Best Supporting Actor (Eusebio Poncela).

It was filmed in Buenos Aires, Argentina; Madrid, and Almería, Spain.

Plot summary
Martín, known as Hache, is a 19-year-old Argentinian boy who after his girlfriend leaves him has a nearly fatal drug overdose, thought by many to be an attempted suicide. Afterwards, his mother sends him to Madrid to live with his father, Martin.

Martin, a successful film-maker, doesn't want to take care of his son because he likes living alone and being able to socialize with his two friends, Alicia and Dante, without influencing his son in any negative way since both Alicia and Dante are experienced drug users. Regardless, he brings him into his home, hoping to ward off any evil influences that might cause his son to have a relapse and commit suicide.

As time passes and Martin's friendships get more strained, it becomes clear that Hache needs to leave his father's place and make a name for himself.

Cast
 Federico Luppi as Martín
 Juan Diego Botto as Hache
 Eusebio Poncela as Dante
 Cecilia Roth as Alicia
 Ana María Picchio (credited as Ana Maria Picchio) as Blanca 
 Sancho Gracia as José M.ª Navarro
 José María Sacristán (credited as José M. Sacristán) as Schauve 
 Will More (credited as Joaquin A. Colmenares) as Coracero 
 Ángel Amorós (credited as Angel Amoros) as Productor Teatro 
 Kojun Notsu as Joven Oriental
 Esther Herrera as Niña Andrógina
 Marisa Cabezón (credited as Marisa Cabezon) as Mujer Espejo 
 Enrique Liporace as Migue
 Claudia Gallegos as Lea
 Leonora Balcarce as Nadia

Background
The title makes reference to the name of the son of Martín, portrayed by Juan Diego Botto, who is named after his father but with an "h" in brackets, which means "hijo" ("hijo" means "son" in Spanish, and "hache" is the Spanish name for the letter "h"). So nearly everybody calls him "Hache." It is similar to calling a son named for his father "Junior" in English. The movie's English subtitles translate "Hache" as "Jay," since "jay" is the English name for the first letter in "junior" and is also a common English given name.

References

External links
 .

1997 films
1997 drama films
Argentine independent films
Films shot in Madrid
Films shot in Buenos Aires
1990s Spanish-language films
Spanish independent films
Films shot in Almería
1997 independent films
Films about immigration to Spain
1990s Spanish films